Three ships of the Royal Navy have been named HMS Pakenham, after Admiral Sir Thomas Pakenham:

 The first  was a 1-gun gunvessel purchased in 1797. She was in service in 1800 and may have been sold in 1802.
 The second HMS Pakenham was an  O-class destroyer. She was renamed  shortly after being launched in 1941.
 The third  was a P-class destroyer built as HMS Onslow but renamed shortly after being launched in 1941. She was sunk in 1943

Royal Navy ship names